Vietnamese people in Poland form one of the ethnic minorities in Poland. The Vietnamese-Polish community is the fourth-largest Vietnamese community in the European Union, after France, Germany, and Czechia, although its numbers are difficult to estimate, with common estimates ranging from 40,000 to 50,000 (2022). They are Poland's largest immigrant community whose culture is not European, and are often perceived by the Polish public as being one of the largest minorities in Poland; the factual verification of that claim is difficult due to lack of precise data. While enjoying economic success and, along with other immigrants, perceived as a competition in the workforce, the Vietnamese community is regarded  positively in Poland.

Demography

There are no precise data on the number of Vietnamese people in Poland, as many, likely at least 50%, are illegal immigrants. The Polish census of 2011 had 4,027 respondents indicate Vietnamese as their nationality. The Vietnamese embassy and Vietnamese community leaders in Poland estimate that about 20,000 to 30,000 Vietnamese people may reside in Poland, though the Polish government in 2002 put the upper possible range at about 50,000. A 2008 Polish government report gave the range of 25,000–60,000, a 2012 media report also suggested an upper range of 60,000, while a 2014 academic paper provided an estimate of 35,000, with a note that this number is "hard to estimate". As they  are Poland's largest immigrant community whose culture is not European, they are also one of Poland's most visible immigrant groups. Members of the Polish public commonly hold the mistaken belief that Vietnamese form Poland's largest foreign community, a title which in fact belongs to migrants from the former USSR.

The Vietnamese-Polish population is concentrated in the Polish capital of Warsaw, and to a lesser extent in other major cities.

History

Poland–Vietnam relations grew from the 1950s and 1980s student exchange programs, during which time both Poland and Vietnam were communist countries. Following the Polish transition to a capitalist economy in 1990, Poland became a more attractive immigration destination for the Vietnamese people, in particular, small entrepreneurs; this triggered a second, larger wave of Vietnamese immigrants to Poland.

The 10th-Anniversary Stadium has been called the center of the Vietnamese-Polish community. The Vietnamese community is also served by a number of non-governmental organizations, run by the community itself.

Language

Although English remains the most popular foreign language in Poland, there is an increasing number of students interested in other languages, including Vietnamese.

In 2007, the Lac Long Quan School was opened in Warsaw to teach the language to Vietnamese children and provide Vietnamese adults working and living abroad with the opportunity to practice speaking their own language. Aside from learning the Vietnamese language, students are also educated in Vietnamese art, history, geography, culture, and customs. Additionally, the school holds festivals and other important events on special occasions like Tết, Vietnamese lunar new year. Later, the school opened new branches in Raszyn and Wrocław.

See also 

Poland–Vietnam relations
:Category: Polish people of Vietnamese descent

References

Notes

Sources

Ewa Nowicka, Young Vietnamese generation in Poland: caught between a rock and a hard place, Przegląd ZachodniI, 2014, No. II

Further reading

 

Asian_diaspora_in_Poland
Ethnic groups in Poland
Poland, Vietnamese people in
 
Poland–Vietnam relations